William P. Kozlovsky is a former rear admiral in the United States Coast Guard.

Biography
Kozlovsky is a native of Wausau, Wisconsin. He graduated first in his class from Purdue University in 1963.

Career
Kozlovsky graduated first in his class from the United States Coast Guard Academy in 1954. He then served aboard the USCGC Gresham (WAVP-387) until 1956.

From 1960 to 1962, Kozlovsky was a search and rescue pilot based out of Coast Guard Air Station San Francisco. Later, he was stationed at Coast Guard Air Station Barbers Point. Additionally, he graduated from the Air War College.

Kozlovsky's later assignments included Chief of the Budge Division of the Coast Guard from 1973 to 1976, Comptroller of the Coast Guard from 1980 to 1986 and Chief of the Office of Acquisition of the Coast Guard from 1986 to 1987.

Awards he received during his career include the Legion of Merit, the Meritorious Service Medal, the Air Medal, the Coast Guard Commendation Medal and the Coast Guard Achievement Medal.

References

People from Wausau, Wisconsin
Military personnel from Wisconsin
Aviators from Wisconsin
United States Coast Guard admirals
Recipients of the Legion of Merit
Recipients of the Air Medal
United States Coast Guard Academy alumni
Purdue University alumni
Air War College alumni
Living people
Year of birth missing (living people)